Kydonies (Greek: Κυδωνιές) may refer to several places in Greece:

Kydonies, Grevena, a village in the municipal unit Agios Kosmas, Grevena regional unit, Greece
Nees Kydonies, a village in the municipal unit Loutropoli Thermis, Lesbos, Greece
the Greek name for the town Ayvalık, Aegean coast, Turkey